Roupala brachybotrys is a species of plant in the family Proteaceae. It is endemic to Ecuador.

References

Flora of Ecuador
brachybotrys
Endangered plants
Taxonomy articles created by Polbot